Buchambi is a Ward from Maswa District in Simiyu Region, Tanzania.

In 2016 the Tanzania National Bureau of Statistics report there were 14,553 people in the ward, from 13,520 in 2012. The ward has .

References

Maswa District
Simiyu Region